Eikhoigi Yum (English: Our Home)  is a 2022 Indian Meitei language film directed by Romi Meitei. It is jointly produced by Sheetal Chingsu and Romi Meitei under the banner of Thangarakpa Living Frames. The film got official selection at the 22nd Jio MAMI Mumbai Film Festival 2022. It was the opening film at the 1st Eikhoigi Imphal International Film Festival 2022. Eikhoigi Yum got official selection in the International Competition Section at the 27th International Film Festival of Kerala 2022.

The film was certified by Central Board of Film Certification (CBFC) in 2021.

Cast
 Master Ningthoujam Priyojit as Chaoren
 Sorri Senjam
 Nganthoibi
 Bhumeshore

Accolades
Eikhoigi Yum won five awards at the 14th Manipur State Film Awards 2022.

References

External links
 

Meitei-language films
2022 films